HMS Tally-Ho was a British submarine of the third group of the T class. She was built as P317 by Vickers Armstrong, Barrow and launched on 23 December 1942. She has been the only ship of the Royal Navy to bear the name, that of the hunting call, "Tally-Ho!".

Second World War service
While commanded by Captain Leslie W. A. Bennington, Tally-Ho served in the Far East for much of her wartime career, where she sank thirteen small Japanese sailing vessels, a Japanese coaster, the Japanese water carrier Kisogawa Maru,  the Japanese army cargo ships Ryuko and Daigen Maru No.6, the Japanese auxiliary submarine chaser Cha 2, and the Japanese auxiliary minelayer Ma 4. She also damaged a small Japanese motor vessel, and laid mines, one of which damaged the Japanese merchant tanker Nichiyoku Maru.

Tally-Ho sank the German commanded U-boat  (formerly the Italian submarine Giuliani), just off the western mouth of Malacca Strait on 14 February 1944.

On the night of 24 February 1944 Tally-Ho was ordered back to the Sembilan Islands, and while zig-zagging on the surface at night charging the batteries, lookouts spotted two wakes ahead. Believing there was a possibility of the two vessels being friendly (both  and  being in the area), Tally-Ho immediately altered course to avoid a collision with the rapidly approaching vessels. On making a challenge with the Aldis lamp the vessels responded by altering course straight towards them and dropping depth charges, leaving no doubt they were unfriendly vessels. At this point the closest ship fired a shell which passed dangerously close over Tally-Hos conning tower before the attacker passed closely by the submarine and then turned for another attack. During this encounter Tally-Ho had been unable to dive due to the proximity of the attackers and the shallowness of the waters in the strait. In addition, diving would have presented the attacking ships with the opportunity to ram or depth charge the submarine.

In the darkness Tally-Ho manoeuvred to a parallel course to the approaching attacker and the enemy vessel passed closely by the submarine, a loud hammering and tearing noise being heard as the ship passed, the vessel being identified as a Hayabusa-class torpedo boat of 600 tons. As the attacker disappeared in the murk Tally-Ho took on a list to port and assumed a marked bow-down attitude. Bennington decided that the batteries would have sufficient charge to risk diving which Tally-Ho then did. Before closing the conning tower hatch, he noticed that the submarine had taken on a 12-degree list. Tally-Ho remained dived for the following 12 hours before surfacing after dark at 18:25.

Upon surfacing it was noticed that the submarine's list had increased to 15 degrees, and it was possible to see the damage to the submarine's port ballast tanks which were all open at the top and beyond further use. With transfer of fuel and water from various tanks and moving of stores and torpedoes, the bow-down attitude was reduced to 4 degrees, and the three-day journey to Trincomalee commenced. This was uneventful apart from encountering a monsoon during the passage of the Bay of Bengal. Arriving at Trincomalee harbour on 29 February 1944, Tally-Ho missed her escort and found herself amongst Admiral James Sommerville's battle fleet at exercises. Later, upon examination in dry dock prior to repairs, the extent of the damage to Tally-Hos port ballast tanks became apparent. The rotating screws of the torpedo boat had run the length of the tanks, chewing large holes in them, phosphor bronze fragments of the attacker's propeller blades being discovered inside. Post-war enquiries learned that their attacker's behaviour after the attack had been due to a combination of Tally-Hos lowered port bow hydroplane having pierced the torpedo boat's hull, and the vessel's port screw having been shorn of its blades almost down to the hub.

On 6 Oct 1944, Tally-Ho sank the Japanese auxiliary submarine chaser Cha-2 (130 tons) about 110 nautical miles south-west of Penang, British Malaya in position . On 29 October 1944, Tally-Ho departed Ceylon carrying an OSS-sponsored three-man Free Thai team bound for Siam. On the way, Tally-Ho tried unsuccessfully to intercept a German submarine. The journey was further delayed by a search for downed Allied airmen near the Straits of Malacca. The Free Thai team was finally landed on Ko Kradan, Trang Province, on 9 November.

Postwar service
Tally-Ho survived World War II and continued in service with the Royal Navy. At the end of the war she was working up in British waters after a refit, following which she joined the 6th Submarine Flotilla in Australia. In 1947, she joined the 3rd Submarine Flotilla based at Rothesay in Scotland. In 1949, Tally-Ho was deployed to Canada in July, relieving , where the submarine trained with the Royal Canadian Navy (RCN) in anti-submarine warfare. Following her service in Canada, Tally-Ho was assigned to the America and West Indies Squadron. In 1953 she took part in the Fleet Review to celebrate the Coronation of Queen Elizabeth II.

In 1954 HMS Tally Ho spent another spell in Canada, and also completed a voyage from Bermuda to the UK entirely underwater, using her "snort", only the second submarine to do so, taking 3 weeks to complete the journey.  The Glasgow Herald reported, "Men in the submarine Tally Ho expect to see daylight today for the first time in three weeks, the time it has taken the craft to travel at 'snorting' depth across the Atlantic from Bermuda. The object of the operation is to gain experience of the behaviour of a 'T' class submarine in such conditions and to train personnel in 'snorting' techniques and submarine operations generally".

She was sold to Thos. W. Ward and scrapped at Briton Ferry, Wales on 10 February 1967.

References

Publications
 
 
 
 
 
 
 

 

British T-class submarines of the Royal Navy
Ships built in Barrow-in-Furness
1942 ships
World War II submarines of the United Kingdom
Cold War submarines of the United Kingdom